Jürgen Hans Paul Rieger (11 May 1946, Blexen, Lower Saxony – 29 October 2009) was a Hamburg lawyer, avowed anti-semite, and deputy chairman of the National Democratic Party of Germany (NPD) (as of October 2009), known for his Holocaust denial.
Rieger represented Arpad Wigand former SS Police Leader of the Warsaw district in Occupied Poland, in his trial for war crimes in Hamburg District Court. Wigand was subsequently found guilty in December 1981, and sentenced to 12.5 years.

Rieger was convicted among other for battery, incitement of the people (Volksverhetzung), and the use of prohibited symbols.

Rieger joined the NPD in 2006, and became Hamburg chairman in 2007. He worked in the Heathen Artgemeinschaft Germanische Glaubens-Gemeinschaft over many years. In the 1990s he was active in the now-suppressed far-right Wiking-Jugend and Freiheitliche Deutsche Arbeiterpartei.

He was an important figure for the NPD, because of his several party donations, the total amount was €500,000.

On 29 October 2009, Rieger died in Berlin from a stroke.

It is alleged that he used the pen name Jörg Rieck for some of his publications, including in his contribution to the "programmatic" book of the Thule Seminar, Das unvergängliche Erbe. Rieger was editor of the pseudoscientific racialist Neue Anthropologie, sister journal to Roger Pearson's Mankind Quarterly.

He was organiser of annual Rudolf Hess commemorations in Wunsiedel.

See also
 The Beast Reawakens

References

External links 
 last existing state of his Website at the Internet Archive. Version from 2011-07-19 

1946 births
2009 deaths
People from Nordenham
Free German Workers' Party politicians
National Democratic Party of Germany politicians
Politicians from Hamburg
German Holocaust deniers
German neo-Nazis
German nationalists
German modern pagans
Adherents of Germanic neopaganism